The Ponce Historic Zone (La Zona Histórica de Ponce) is a historic district in downtown Ponce, Puerto Rico, consisting of buildings and structures with architecture that date to the late nineteenth and early twentieth centuries. The zone goes by various names, including Ponce Tradicional (Traditional Ponce), Ponce Centro (Ponce Center), Ponce Histórico (Historic Ponce), and Distrito Histórico (Historic District).

History

Carmelo Rosario Natal has linked the origins of the Ponce Historic Zone to an event that took place on 8 June 1893. On that date, La Gaceta de Puerto Rico, the insular government's official periodical, published an edict of the Governor of Puerto Rico, Antonio Daban y Ramirez de Arellano, that mandated municipal authorities throughout the Island to divide, for fire control purposes, a town's urban center into three zones: stone-built, build with fire resistant materials, and built with combustible materials. No structure could be built, rebuilt or restored within a minimum of 50 meters from the town's central square unless it was stoned-built or it was to be upgraded to a stone-built structure. According to Rosario Natal, those were the roots of what almost 70 years later would be called the Ponce Historic Zone.

On 20 June 1960, governor Luis Muñoz Marín amended the law regarding historic zones, making it possible for Ponce to be included in such category.  On 6 June 1962, the Zone was officially designated as such, and initially included only the center core of the city, but it was later expanded to include a much larger area. On that date (6 June 1962) the Instituto de Cultura Puertorriqueña, with the concurrence of the Puerto Rico Planning Board, approved a resolution creating the Zone. The Zone included a list of 22, mostly contiguous areas, including specific buildings, structures, plaza, streets and sectors that were to be preserved. It also included an area in barrio Playa, including the ruins of the old Fuerte de San José. 

It was not long before the creation of the Zone was opposed by local developers and the real estate service industry. Ismaro Torruella, president of the Municipal Assembly, who was originally one of the supporters of the creation of the Zone, succumbed to mounting pressure from local developers, business people and realtors and, by 1962, now favored the elimination, or at least the limitation, of the Zone. "The evidence on this matter is clear. Torruella and his colleagues wanted to make sure the public hearing [of 10 March 1965] was controlled by them." Opposing groups sought to make their voices known to the townspeople at large, not just to the Municipal Government and the ICP, and formed "Comite de Ciudadanos para el Progreso de Ponce" (Citizens Committee Ponce's Progress). This committee included prominent businessmen such as Juan Eugenio Candal, Jose Maria Rovira, Gustavo Armstrong, Jose Moscoso, Tito Castro, among several others. To counter this group, supporters of the Historic Zone created their own "Comite Ponceño Pro Buen Progreso" (Ponce Citizens' Committee for Fair Progress)." The debates went on for years with many public hearings taking place. Professional urban planning, traffic, and architectural studies, among others, also took place and recommendations were provided. One study categorized the architectural styles in the Historic Zone into seven groups: Neoclassical European, Spanish Colonial, Ponce Creole, Criollo Pueblerino,  Criollo Residencial Pueblerino, Neoclassical Creole, and Neoclassical Superior.

On 17 November 2005, then-Governor of Puerto Rico, Aníbal Acevedo Vilá, signed Executive Order Number 72, approving the historic Ponce center as a Historic Center of First Order.

Location
The zone is located in what is commonly called Ponce Pueblo ("Ponce Town") – the central downtown and oldest area of the city. While there are several roads that lead to it, the most common point of entry is via PR-1, which turns into the Miguel Pou Boulevar, and then into the one-way Calle Isabel, leading to the center of Ponce at the Plaza Las Delicias. A map of the area covered by the Ponce Historic Zone is available (in 2011) from the government of the municipality of Ponce.<ref>[http://www.visitaaponce.com/mapa.aspx# Mapa Interactivo.]  Government of the Autonomous Municipality of Ponce. Accessed 10 October 2011.</ref>

In addition to Plaza Las Delicias, with its unique Parque de Bombas and Nuestra Señora de la Guadalupe Cathedral, the zone includes landmarks such as Ponce City Hall, Armstrong-Poventud Residence, Ponce High School, and Panteón Nacional Román Baldorioty de Castro. Numerous other attractions in this historic area are listed in the NRHP, such as Banco de Ponce, Casa Paoli, and Casa de la Masacre.  Others, such as Teatro Fox Delicias, Teatro La Perla, Plaza de Mercado, Hotel Meliá, and Paseo Atocha are not listed but possess significant historical value.  Street corners in most of this zone have chamfered corners (Spanish: esquinas de chaflán), typical of Barcelona, Spain.

Plan Ponce en Marcha

In the 1990s an intensive $440 millionWelcome to Puerto Rico: Ponce. Nearly one half a billion dollars have been spent preserving the colonial core of Ponce. Retrieved 30 November 2009. revitalization project called "Plan Ponce en Marcha" ("Ponce on the Move Plan") has increased the city's historic area from 260 to 1,046 buildings. The Ponce en Marcha project was conceived in 1985 by then governor Rafael Hernández Colón during his second term in La Fortaleza. A significant number of buildings in Ponce are listed in the National Register of Historic Places. The nonprofit Project for Public Places listed the historic downtown Ponce city center as one of the 60 of the World's Great Places, for its "graciously preserved showcase of Caribbean culture". The Ponce en Marcha project has given even more form to the definition, establishment, and development of the Ponce Historic Zone. The plan is the result of litigation between the Government of the Autonomous Municipality of Ponce and the Government of Puerto Rico.

The Ponce en Marcha plan projects involve several departments of the Government of Puerto Rico: Arturo Picó Valls: Confía en el nuevo juez del pleito Ponce en Marcha. Reinaldo Millán. La Perla del Sur. Ponce, Puerto Rico. 27 January 2010. (Year 28, Issue 1365. page 17) Accessed 6 February 2018.

 The Puerto Rico Departamento de la Vivienda must complete the "Riberas del Bucaná III" residential project, and rehabilitate housing in the Baldorioty, La Ponderosa, and Lomas de Guaraguao sectors. It must rehabilitate the homes in the Puerto Viejo sector in barrio Playa plus 200 units of uninhabited lots citywide, restart the program "Tu Ciudad Renace", and demolish the housing project "Residencial Las Terrazas".
 The Puerto Rico Autoridad de Carreteras must comply with the construction of the bridge at the intersection of PR-2 and Punto Oro, the two projects required to complete the Anillo de Circunvalación de Ponce, and three bridges over Avenida Maruca.
 The Puerto Rico Autoridad de Edificios Públicos, must swap land belonging to the Puerto Rico Police Marine Unit in exchange for improvements to "Parque Julio González", and must complete the construction of the Ponce Headquarters of the Puerto Rico Police.
 The Puerto Rico Autoridad de Energía Eléctrica must complete Phase III of the burial of aerial cabling within the "Zona Histórica", as well as Phase VI.
 The Puerto Rico Autoridad de Acueductos Alcantarillados must complete the design of the water filtration plant at barrio Cerrillos, the acquisition of land for its construction and its distribution network.
 The Puerto Rico Autoridad de los Puertos must expand the runway and taxiway at Mercedita Airport and build the maintenance building.
 The Puerto Rico Departamento de Recursos Naturales'' must comply with the construction of the Portugués and Bucaná rivers lineal park, as well as the canalization of the Matilde, Pastillo y Canas rivers and the development of the La Matilde Natural Reserve and the Caja de Muertos Light.

Designation categories

Structures within the historic zone are classified into four categories:

 The first consists of structures "with a monumental historic value", and part of the city's heritage.
 The second is for those structures that while lacking a monumental historic value, possess some qualities of historic, architectural, or cultural interest.
 The third category includes those structures of contextual value. These are those structures that may not intrinsically possess historic, architectural, or cultural value individually, but do enhance the area when they are considered contextually, as part of a larger group, as part of urban characteristic, or as part of the architecture of a section of a street.
 And finally, category 4 is reserved for those structures that exist within the historic zone but whose value has not been assessed, that is, they are unclassified.

Sub-zones

The historic zone itself consists of three distinct sub-zones:
 First Order Zone – This zone is limited to the area immediately surrounding Plaza Las Delicias. This is the original historic zone, created in 1962.
 Second Order Zone – This is a zone that was added in 1989 further increasing the perimeter of the area around Plaza Las Delicias.
 Third Order Zone – This zone was added in 1992, and it covered the communities of Mariani, Belgica, and parts of Clausells, and Cantera. It was also extended, for the first time, east of Rio Portugues, to cover the community of La Alhambra.

In August 2003, Mayor Cordero favored a measure to exclude Belgica, Claussells, and Cantera — all poor, low-income communities — from the historic zone.

See also

References

External links
 

Historic districts in Puerto Rico
Buildings and structures in Ponce, Puerto Rico
.
1962 establishments in Puerto Rico
2005 establishments in Puerto Rico
Tourist attractions in Ponce, Puerto Rico